The Sarsılmaz Kılınç 2000 is a semi-automatic pistol chambered for the 9×19mm Parabellum round. It is manufactured at the Sarsılmaz Silah Sanayi factory in Turkey. It was previously sold in the U.S. by the ArmaLite corporation under the ArmaLite name as the AR-24.

It is now self-imported by SAR USA as the SAR2000 with an updated thick rubber tactical grip and black phosphate finish.

Design
The weapon is similar to the Tanfoglio variant of the Czech CZ-75, with design elements borrowed from the SIG P210, though few of its parts are interchangeable with the Tanfoglio weapon from whose machining dies and blue prints it was derived. It has a hot forged steel frame mated to a heavy milled slide treated with manganese phosphate, and coated in heat-cured epoxy.

Variants
The AR-24/15 Standard model has a parkerized finish and fixed dovetailed rear sights and a proprietary front sight with three white paint dots.

The AR-24/15C Tactical Custom Model has checkering machined on the front and back grip straps and its rear notch sight is adjustable for windage.

The AR-24K/13 Compact and AR-24K/13C Compact Tactical Custom are like the full-sized variants, differing only in their shorter barrels, grips, and amount of ammunition carried.

References

External links
Official page from Sarsilmaz

9mm Parabellum semi-automatic pistols
Semi-automatic pistols of Turkey